"Ladies in the '90s" is a song co-written and recorded by American country music singer Lauren Alaina. It was released on October 15, 2018 as the lead single from the EP Getting Good.

Content
"Ladies in the '90s" was written by Lauren Alaina, Jesse Frasure, and Amy Wadge, and produced by busbee. Lyrically, the song pays homage to female artists and hit songs from the 1990s, a "decade of female superstars" that Alaina (who was born in 1994) looks back on fondly for its abundance of women on the radio that inspired her to become a singer. The song makes references to major country hits like "Strawberry Wine" and "Man! I Feel Like a Woman!", while also name-dropping songs from other genres, such as Britney Spears' "...Baby One More Time", Spice Girls' "Wannabe", and TLC's "No Scrubs".

Music video
The music video for "Ladies in the '90s" premiered on May 29, 2019, and features Alaina acting as a QVC spokesperson displaying popular products of the 1990s. It was directed by Benjamin Skipworth.

Charts

References

2018 songs
2018 singles
Lauren Alaina songs
Universal Music Group singles
19 Recordings singles
Mercury Nashville singles
Country ballads
Song recordings produced by busbee
Songs written by Jesse Frasure
Songs written by Amy Wadge
Songs written by Lauren Alaina